This is a list of mayors and the later lord mayors of the City of Westminster.

After having elected a mayor since its creation as a Metropolitan Borough in 1900, the City of Westminster was awarded the dignity of a Lord Mayoralty by letters patent dated 11 March 1966. 

The Lord Mayor of Westminster is ex-officio the deputy High Steward of Westminster Abbey. By tradition, the Lord Mayor of Westminster visits Oslo every year in the late autumn to take part in the felling of the Trafalgar Square Christmas tree.

Mayors

Lord Mayors

References

Westminster